Roberto Friedrich (born 9 May 1945) is a Mexican rower. He competed at the 1964 Summer Olympics and the 1968 Summer Olympics.

References

External links
 

1945 births
Living people
Mexican male rowers
Olympic rowers of Mexico
Rowers at the 1964 Summer Olympics
Rowers at the 1968 Summer Olympics
Rowers from Mexico City